What Price Decency is a 1933 American drama film directed by Arthur Gregor and starring Dorothy Burgess, Alan Hale and Walter Byron. The director adapted the story from one his own plays. It is now considered a lost film.

Cast
 Dorothy Burgess as Norma  
 Alan Hale as Klaus van Leyden  
 Walter Byron as Tom O'Neil  
 Henry Durant as Matizzi  
 Val Duran as Pimo

References

Bibliography
 Goble, Alan. The Complete Index to Literary Sources in Film. Walter de Gruyter, 1999.

External links
 

1933 films
1933 drama films
American drama films
Films directed by Arthur Gregor
American black-and-white films
Majestic Pictures films
Lost American films
American films based on plays
1933 lost films
Lost drama films
1930s English-language films
1930s American films